These are the official results of the Men's Decathlon competition at the 1999 World Championships in Seville, Spain. There were a total number of 25 participating athletes, including nine non-finishers. The competition started on Tuesday August 24, 1999, and ended on Wednesday August 25, 1999. The event was one of the permit meetings of the 1999 IAAF World Combined Events Challenge.

Medalists

Schedule

Tuesday, August 24

Wednesday, August 25

Records

Results

See also
 1998 Men's European Championships Decathlon
 1999 Hypo-Meeting
 1999 Decathlon Year Ranking
 2000 Men's Olympic Decathlon

References
 Results
 decathlon2000
 trackandfieldnews

D
Decathlon at the World Athletics Championships